Suchet may refer to:

People 
 David Suchet (born 1946), British actor
 Jack Suchet (1908–2001), British physician; father of David and John
 John Suchet (1944), British newsreader
 Louis-Gabriel Suchet (1770–1826), Marshal of the First French Empire

Other uses 
 Le Suchet, a mountain in Switzerland
 French cruiser Suchet